Roger Yelverton Dawson-Yelverton (1845–1912) was a Welsh barrister, Chief Justice of the Bahamas from 1890 to 1893. After he added his middle name to his surname, he was often known as Roger Yelverton or R. D. Yelverton.

Early life
He was born 15 June 1845, the son of Roger Dawson and Barbara Yelverton Powys, and was educated at Rugby School. He matriculated at Magdalen Hall, Oxford in 1865, at age 20, and entered the Middle Temple in 1866. In 1867 he moved university, matriculating at Downing College, Cambridge, and was called to the bar at the Middle Temple, in 1869.

He took the additional surname of Yelverton (see below under Family). As a barrister he went the South-Eastern Circuit and became Deputy Judge of West London County Courts.

Chief Justice of the Bahamas
Dawson-Yelverton was appointed Chief Justice in 1890 as successor to Henry William Austin. Like Austin, he clashed with Ormond Drimmie Malcolm, Attorney-General of the colony: he showed some racial prejudice against Malcolm in a letter to Austin. Like Austin, he encountered opposition to reforming measures and impartial justice from Ambrose Shea, the colony's governor, who sided with the interests of a white business clique in the islands. He was ousted from the post in 1893.

Joseph Chamberlain met Shea in Montreal in 1890, and became interested in Shea's account of sisal in the colony. Later that year his sons Austen and Neville Chamberlain visited Shea in Nassau, and composed a report for their father on the prospects for investment in sisal, which Shea represented as bright. When in 1892 Dawson-Yelverton became embroiled in a contempt of court dispute with Alfred Moseley, editor of the Nassau Guardian, Shea backed Moseley and, via a delegation of powers from the Colonial Office, released him from prison. A public row escalated, and after the 1892 general election brought the Liberal Marquess of Ripon to the Colonial Office, Dawson-Yelverton appealed to him. Shea countered with the influence of Joseph Chamberlain, who had invested on Andros in a wharf and sisal estate managed by his son Neville. The Colonial Office took the view that "abuses have existed and Mr. Yelverton has not conciliated the local clique."

The matter went to the Judicial Committee of the Privy Council. Dawson-Yelverton argued for judicial independence. Lord Coleridge CJ made it clear to him that a letter to the Pall Mall Gazette alleging government corruption in the colony had made it impossible for him to return there. Dawson-Yelverton resigned in anticipation of a dismissal. He was succeeded by Charles George Walpole.

Later life
After his time in the Bahamas, Dawson-Yelverton gave attention to miscarriages of justice, in particular the case of George Edalji in 1905. He organised a petition to the Home Secretary on Edalji's behalf. He also concerned himself with the Adolf Beck case.

Dawson-Yelverton chaired the League of Criminal Appeal, and lobbied successfully, from 1888, for the creation of a Court of Criminal Appeal. He died on 5 July 1912, at Folkestone, and is buried in Plaistow Cemetery.

Family
Dawson-Yelverton married in 1872 Ellen Lawrence, daughter of James Lawrence of Park Hill, Lancashire, a brewer who was Mayor of Liverpool in 1844, and sister of Edward Lawrence.

His change of surname was connected to his descent in the fourth generation from Henry Yelverton, 3rd Earl of Sussex, who died without male heirs. The 3rd Earl was the maternal grandfather of his maternal grandfather, and conditions in the Earl's will reached down, and gave him reason to add the Yelverton surname.

His maternal grandfather was Frederick Powys (1782–1850), third son of Thomas Powys, 1st Baron Lilford; who married Mary Gould, daughter of Edward Thoroton Gould and Barbara Yelverton, who was daughter of the 3rd Earl of Sussex. (Some sources conflate Barbara Yelverton Powys, his mother, with the daughter of the 3rd Earl.)

Notes

1845 births
1912 deaths
Welsh barristers